Emperor Zarkon, known as  in the original Japanese language Beast King GoLion, is a fictional character in the media franchise Voltron and an antagonist of the Voltron Force, who made his first appearance in Voltron.

Voltron: Defender of the Universe

King Zarkon is ruler of Planet Daibazaal who blames others for his failures. At times he can be a more restrained leader, particularly when Lotor does something rash, Zarkon will calmly handle the situation and chastise his son in private.

Voltron: The Third Dimension

King Zarkon became an ally of the Voltron force against Prince Lotor as a member of the Galactic council. It turns out to be a ruse as he was secretly working with his son.

Voltron: Legendary Defender

Zarkon was ruler of Daibazaal and the original black Paladin of Voltron. He ruled the Galra Empire for 10,000 years. Zarkon became corrupted by Quintessence and unknown dark forces from an alternate reality which led to a revolt against king Alfor to claim Voltron for himself. With the absence of all five Lions, Zarkon assumed that Voltron was destroyed but rediscovers the lions and wants it for himself. Zarkon eventually gets killed by his son, prince Lotor.

The character was made a more sophisticated character than his 1984 counterpart. During flashbacks of Voltron: Legendary Defender, Zarkon is voiced by Kevin Durand instead of Neil Kaplan. Voltron writers said the reason a different voice actor was chosen to show how Zarkon is not the original person he once was.

Comics

In the 2011 Devil's Due comics the Emperor Zarkon character appears in the book.

In popular culture
The character appeared in an ad campaign for the Sprite soft drink in the 1990s.

References

Television characters introduced in 1984
Voltron
Male characters in animation
Villains in animated television series
Extraterrestrial supervillains
Fictional characters who use magic
Fictional commanders
Fictional humanoids
Fictional emperors and empresses
Fictional warlords
Galactic emperors